Solimonas terrae is a Gram-negative, aerobic, rod-shaped and motile bacterium from the genus of Solimonas which has been isolated from soil from the Gaui Island from Korea.

References

Bacteria described in 2014
Gammaproteobacteria